The 2007 Desert 400 was the twelfth round of the 2007 V8 Supercar season. It was held on the weekend of the 1 to 3 November at Bahrain International Circuit in Bahrain.

External links
 Desert 400 website

Desert 400
Desert 400